Companhia Brasileira de Cartuchos (CBC) is based in Ribeirão Pires, São Paulo, Brazil.

Company Profile 

World leader in ammunition for portable weapons and one of the main suppliers to NATO, CBC is the premier Defense brand in the small caliber segment. CBC products are used globally and contribute to the protection and security of millions of people.

CBC was created in Brazil in 1926 and holds the status of Strategic Defense Company, being the primary supplier to the local military and law enforcement sectors. It serves as the headquarters for CBC Global Ammunition, the holding for a group of companies internationally active in the ammunition sector: CBC Brazil, Magtech Ammunition USA, MEN Germany and Sellier & Bellot Czech Republic.

This strategic alliance forms one of the largest ammunition corporations in the world, with a combined experience of more than 300 years in the manufacturing of small and medium calibers.

The comprehensive range of CBC products is exported to over 100 countries, meeting the needs of Military, Law Enforcement and Commercial markets.

Together, CBC Global operations employ 3,500 skilled workers and produce over 1.5 billion rounds of ammunition per year.

In 2000, it opened its second plant for the production of firearms and pressure weapons in the city of Montenegro, in the state of Rio Grande do Sul, and in the respective years of 2007 and 2009,  it acquired the European manufacturers of ammunition and supplies Sellier & Bellot and MEN, besides investing in the production of ammunition outside Brazil.

In 2015, after approval by the Administrative Council for Economic Defense (CADE), it became the majority shareholder in Taurus Armas, buying 52.67% of its shares.

Since 2004, the company organizes together with Taurus, the CBC/Taurus Regional Championships that are held in shooting clubs all over the country with the most diverse modalities and competition categories, allowing shooters to participate with the use of firearms or pressure weapons.

Production sites 
CBC has three production units in Brazil, one in the state of São Paulo and two in Rio Grande do Sul.

Products 

CBC Products (Military)

 9×19mm
 5.56×45mm
 7.62×51mm
 12.7×99mm (.50 BMG)
 20×102mm 
 20×110mm
 20×128mm
 30×113mm
 Sniper1 line: 5,56/223 - 308/7,62 / .50 (12,7X99) / .338

Magtech Products (Commercial)

 .25 Auto
 .22 LR
 .32 Auto
 .32 S&W
 .32 S&W Long
 .357 Magnum
 .38 S&W
 .38 Special-Short
 .38 Special
 .38 Super Auto
 .38 Wad Cutter
 .380 Auto
 .40 S&W
 .44 Magnum
 .44 Special
 .44-40 WIN
 .45 Auto
 .45 GAP
 .45 Colt
 .454 Casull
 .500 S&W
 9mm Luger
 9×21mm
 .223 Remington
 .30 Carbine
 .308 Winchester
 .300 AAC Blackout
 6.5 Creedmoor

References

External links
 Companhia Brasileira de Cartuchos (in Portuguese)
 CBC Defense - International Website (in English)
 MEN
 Sellier&Bellot
 Magtech Ammunition
 CBC Global Ammunition (Corporate Website)

Companhia Brasileira de Cartuchos
Firearm manufacturers of Brazil
Companies based in São Paulo (state)
Defence companies of Brazil
Manufacturing companies established in 1926
Ammunition manufacturers
1926 establishments in Brazil
Brazilian brands